Business as Usual is a 1987 drama film written and directed by Lezli-An Barrett. It stars Glenda Jackson and John Thaw.

Plot
Babs Flynn (Jackson) is the manager of a Liverpool boutique. When she accuses the regional manager of sexual harassment, she is sacked. Flynn then mounts a public campaign to get her job back. It stars Craig Charles as Cathy Tyson's love interest. The story is based on a real case of Audrey White at a chain of Lady at Lord John boutiques.

Cast
 Glenda Jackson as Babs Flynn
 John Thaw as Kieran Flynn
 Cathy Tyson as Josie Patterson
 Eamon Boland as Mr. Barry
 James Hazeldine as Mark
 Stephen McGann as Terry Flynn
 Mark McGann as Stevie Flynn
 Craig Charles as Eddie

Awards
Business as Usual won the Grand Prix at the 1988 Créteil International Women's Film Festival.

References

External links
 
 

1987 films
1987 drama films
Golan-Globus films
British independent films
American independent films
American drama films
British drama films
1987 independent films
1980s English-language films
1980s American films
1980s British films